Byrd Leavell is a literary agent at United Talent Agency. Previously he was known as a named partner at the Waxman Leavell Literary Agency.

Career
Leavell graduated from the University of Virginia and the Radcliffe Publishing Program. In 2012, he partnered with Scott Waxman to form the Waxman Leavell Literary Agency.

As a partner at the Waxman Leavell agency, he has overseen multiple New York Times bestsellers including #1 bestselling books Shit My Dad Says by Justin Halpern. Leavell also represents Rob Elliott, whose LOL series has sold more than 2.5 million copies.  He also represented the anonymous Dutch novel Diary of an Oxygen Thief. Leavell also represents Cat Marnell, a former Lucky, XoJane and Vice blogger.

In September 2017 he began his employment at UTA. One of the first clients Leavell represented at UTA was comedian and actor Tiffany Haddish. Haddish's memoir, The Last Black Unicorn, was a debut New York Times bestseller, spending each of its first six weeks in print on the list and, as of January 2018, reaching #5 overall.

Selected clients
According to Publishers Weekly.

Tiffany Haddish
Jay Chandrasekhar
Mark Frauenfelder
GloZell Green
George Karl
Chelsea Handler

Drew Magary
Cat Marnell
Patrick McEnroe
Daniel O'Brien
John L. Parker, Jr.
Brian Kilmeade

Mike Sacks
Pete Sampras
Scott Sigler
Steve Spurrier
"Weird Al" Yankovic
Rich Roll

Guy Raz
Adam Savage
Mandy Stadtmiller
Anthony Sullivan
Jorge Cruise
Mat Best

References

External links
Personal Website
Waxman Leavell Literary Agency
Linkedin Profile

Living people
Year of birth missing (living people)
Literary agents
University of Virginia alumni
Businesspeople from Charlottesville, Virginia